Neoguraleus sinclairi is a species of sea snail, a marine gastropod mollusk in the family Mangeliidae.

Not to be confused with Neoguraleus sinclairi (E.A.Smith, 1884) (synonym of Neoguraleus finlayi Powell, 1942).

Authority
Tucker (2004) states that Drillia sinclairi Gillies, 1882is a nude name, but it is not; Gillies (1882) renamed a misidentification by Hutton (1880), referring to p. 45 where Hutton gave a description of "Defranchia luteo-fasciata". This description is not copied from Reeve's description of "Pleurotoma luteo-fasciata".

Description
The length of the shell attains 11 mm, its diameter 4.5 mm.

Distribution
This marine species is endemic to New Zealand and occurs throughout New Zealand and at the Steward Island and the Chatham Islands; fossils have been found in Pliocene strata.

References

 Gillies, J. (1882) Notes on New Zealand Mollusca. Transactions and Proceedings of the New Zealand Institute, 14, 169–171
 Powell, Arthur William Baden. The New Zealand Recent and Fossil Mollusca of the Family Turridae: With General Notes on Turrid Nomenclature and Systematics. No. 2. Unity Press limited, printers, 1942.
 Powell, A.W.B. 1979: New Zealand Mollusca: Marine, Land and Freshwater Shells, Collins, Auckland (p. 239)
 Spencer, H.G., Marshall, B.A. & Willan, R.C. (2009). Checklist of New Zealand living Mollusca. pp 196–219. in: Gordon, D.P. (ed.) New Zealand inventory of biodiversity. Volume one. Kingdom Animalia: Radiata, Lophotrochozoa, Deuterostomia. Canterbury University Press, Christchurch.

External links
  Tucker, J.K. 2004 Catalog of recent and fossil turrids (Mollusca: Gastropoda). Zootaxa 682:1-1295.
 New Zealand Mollusca: Neoguraleus sinclairi
 Spencer H.G., Willan R.C., Marshall B.A. & Murray T.J. (2011). Checklist of the Recent Mollusca Recorded from the New Zealand Exclusive Economic Zone
 Gastropods.com: Neoguraleus sinclairi
 Tepapa : Drillia sinclairi

sinclairi
Gastropods described in 1882
Gastropods of New Zealand